Hà Anh Tuấn (born December 17, 1984) is a Vietnamese male singer. He became famous when he entered the top 3 of Sao Mai điểm hẹn singing contest.

Biography 
Hà Anh Tuấn was born in Ho Chi Minh City. His parents are from Ninh Bình. He is an alumnus of Lê Hồng Phong High School for the Gifted.

When he was a student, Tuấn participated in various art-related activities of his school and the city. In 2002, he won the first prize in the city's "Student Singing Festival".

After graduating from high school, Tuấn went studying abroad at Technische Universität Darmstadt.

Career
In 2006, after completing his study in Germany, Hà Anh Tuấn returned to Vietnam to participate in the Sao Mai điểm hẹn singing contest held by Vietnam Television (VTV). In that contest, he won the promising singer award and was one of the top 3 most popular singers – alongside singer Hoàng Hải and rocker Phạm Anh Khoa.

After his success at Sao Mai điểm hẹn, he decided to pursue a professional singing career.

In 2007, Tuấn released his first album, Cafe sáng – which consists of 9 songs composed by musicians Võ Thiện Thanh and Hồ Hoài Anh.

In 2008, he was the MC for Phạm Duy's liveshow "Con đường tình ta đi", which was organized by Phuong Nam Film Studio at Hòa Bình Theater.

Discography

Studio albums 
Café sáng (2007)
Saigon Radio (2008)
Acous'84 (2010)
Cock-tail (2010)
Lava (2014)
Streets Rhythm (2015)
Fragile (2017)
Truyện ngắn (2019)
Cuối ngày người đàn ông một mình (2020)

Album released in the US 

Chân dung (2012)
Biết tương tư (2013)
Veston: The Golden Melodies (2018)

Promotional albums 

 Acoustic Guitar: Mơ tóc (2008)

Singles

Music projects 

 See Sing Share 1 (10 episodes)
 See Sing Share 2 – The Love Land (10 episodes)
 See Sing Share 3 – Sweet Memories (10 episodes)
 See Sing Share 4 – Trong rừng có cơn mát lành (9 episoded)

Liveshow 
 December 17, 2016: Liveshow Café in Concert – Nâu nóng at Hanoi Palace of Culture.
 December 22, 2016: Liveshow Café in Concert – Sữa đá at The Youth Cultural Center of Ho Chi Minh City.
 September 9–10, 2017: Liveshow Fragile Live Concert at Hanoi Palace of Culture.
 November 30, 2017: Liveshow Fragile+ Live Concert in Saigon at White Palace, Ho Chi Minh City.
April 7, 2018: Liveshow See Sing Share Concert: Romance – Người đàn ông & bông hoa trên ngực trái at Vietnam National Convention Center, Hanoi.
April 14, 2018: Liveshow See Sing Share Concert: Romance – Người đàn ông & bông hoa trên ngực trái at Hoa Binh Theater, Ho Chi Minh City.
December 23, 2018: Liveshow See Sing Share Concert – Gấu at Da Lat Pedagogical College, Lâm Đồng.
September 13–14,2019: Live Concert: Truyện ngắn – Hội An at Hội An Theater, Quảng Nam.
October 12, 2019: Live Concert: Truyện ngắn at Hòa Bình Theater, Ho Chi Minh City.
October 26, 2019: Live Concert: Truyện ngắn at Vietnam National Convention Center, Hanoi.

External links

References

21st-century Vietnamese male singers
Rhythm and blues singers
Vietnamese businesspeople
1984 births
Living people
People from Ho Chi Minh City